The 2000 FIA GT A1-Ring 500 km was the seventh round the 2000 FIA GT Championship season.  It took place at the A1-Ring, Austria, on August 6, 2000.

Official results
Class winners in bold.  Cars failing to complete 70% of winner's distance marked as Not Classified (NC).

Statistics
 Pole position – #25 Carsport Holland – 1:42.707
 Fastest lap – #25 Carsport Holland – 1:31.586
 Average speed – 162.910 km/h

References

 
 

A
FIA GT